The 2017 Furman Paladins team represented Furman University as a member of the Southern Conference (SoCon) during the 2017 NCAA Division I FCS football season. Led by first-year head coach Clay Hendrix, the Paladins compiled an overall record of 8–5 with a mark of 6–2 in conference play, tying for second-place in the SoCon. Furman received an at-large bid to the NCAA Division I Football Championship playoffs, where they defeated Elon in the first round before losing to the SoCon champion, Wofford, in the second round. The team played home games at Paladin Stadium in Greenville, South Carolina.

Schedule

Game summaries

at Wofford

Elon

at NC State

at Colgate

East Tennessee State

at Chattanooga

VMI

Mercer

at Western Carolina

The Citadel

at Samford

at Elon—FCS First Round

at Wofford—FCS Second Round

References

Furman
Furman Paladins football seasons
Furman
Furman Paladins Football